The 1986–87 Sheffield Shield season was the 85th season of the Sheffield Shield, the domestic first-class cricket competition of Australia. Western Australia won the championship.

Table

Final

Statistics

Most Runs
Mike Veletta 959

Most Wickets
Chris Matthews 47

References

Sheffield Shield
Sheffield Shield
Sheffield Shield seasons